Rutgers Stadium was a stadium in Piscataway Township, New Jersey.  It hosted the Rutgers University Scarlet Knights football team until the school built the new Rutgers Stadium in 1994.  The stadium held 31,219 people at its peak and was opened in 1938.  It also hosted the NCAA Men's Lacrosse Championship on five occasions.

References

External links
 Venue history

Defunct college football venues
Rutgers Scarlet Knights football
NCAA Men's Division I Lacrosse Championship venues
Works Progress Administration in New Jersey
American football venues in New Jersey
Lacrosse venues in the United States
1938 establishments in New Jersey
Sports venues completed in 1938
1993 disestablishments in New Jersey
Sports venues demolished in 1993
Demolished sports venues in New Jersey